Pink TV may refer to: 
 Pink TV (France), a gay-themed French satellite television channel
 Pink TV (US), known as Heat TV in Europe, a pornographic television company based in the US
 Pink TV (Serbia), a TV network based in Serbia